Christopher John Grace (born July 12, 1978) is an American actor. He is known for portraying Eric Forman in the Fox sitcoms That '70s Show and That '90s Show, Eddie Brock / Venom in Sam Raimi's film Spider-Man 3, Pete Monash in Win a Date with Tad Hamilton!, Carter Duryea in In Good Company, Edwin in Predators, Getty in Interstellar, Adrian Yates in American Ultra, and David Duke in Spike Lee's film BlacKkKlansman. His other film roles include Traffic, Mona Lisa Smile, Valentine's Day, Take Me Home Tonight, The Big Wedding, War Machine, Breakthrough, and Irresistible. He currently stars as Tom Hayworth in the comedy series Home Economics.

Early life
Grace was born on July 12, 1978, in New York City, the son of Pat, an assistant to the schoolmaster of the New Canaan Country School, and John Grace, a Madison Avenue executive. He has a sister, Jenny. His paternal grandmother was from a German-Jewish family, whereas his mother is of Irish descent.

Grace grew up in Darien, Connecticut, where actress Kate Bosworth was a middle-school friend, and actress Chloë Sevigny—who later appeared with him in high school stage plays—was sometimes his babysitter.

Career
Grace was cast as Eric Forman on Fox's That '70s Show, which debuted in 1998. He played the role until the show's 8th and final season. His character was written out and replaced with a new character named Randy Pearson (Josh Meyers). Grace made a brief guest appearance in the final episode.

Grace played a prep school student who used marijuana and introduced his girlfriend to freebasing in director Steven Soderbergh's 2000 film Traffic, as well as having uncredited cameos as himself in Soderbergh's Ocean's Eleven and its 2004 sequel, Ocean's Twelve. "The joke is that you're supposed to play the worst version of yourself and I don't think too many people are comfortable with that. I never thought for a second that people were really going to think that's what I was like. I think that people will know that I was faking it in those movies", he told Flaunt magazine in 2007.

He planned to cameo in Ocean's Thirteen. However, due to his role in Spider-Man 3, he had to abandon these plans. As Grace said, "I was doing reshoots on Spider-Man 3. I was bummed. I actually talked to Steven Soderbergh about that and we had a thing and then I couldn't do it." He appeared in director Mike Newell's 2003 film Mona Lisa Smile.

In 2004, Grace played the leading roles in Win a Date with Tad Hamilton! and In Good Company. That same year, he starred in P.S., which received only a limited theatrical release. Grace won the National Board of Review's 2004 award for Breakthrough Performance Actor for his work in In Good Company and P.S.

On January 15, 2005, Grace hosted Saturday Night Live.

In 2007, Grace portrayed Eddie Brock/Venom in Spider-Man 3, directed by Sam Raimi. Grace himself was a fan of the comics and read the Venom stories as a child. In 2009, Grace became the subject of a recurring column on the entertainment/pop culture site Videogum, entitled "What's Up With Topher Grace?"

In 2010, Grace appeared in the ensemble comedy Valentine's Day and played the character of Edwin in Predators.

In 2011, Grace appeared in the 1980s retro comedy Take Me Home Tonight. He co-wrote the script and co-produced the film. Grace also starred opposite Richard Gere in the spy thriller The Double.

In 2012, Grace starred alongside Mary Elizabeth Winstead and Matthew Gray Gubler in the social film The Beauty Inside, which won a Daytime Emmy Award for Outstanding New Approach to an Original Daytime Program or Series in 2013. The film was directed by Drake Doremus and written by Richard Greenberg.

In 2014, Grace starred in the indie thriller The Calling, alongside Susan Sarandon, and appeared in Christopher Nolan's sci-fi adventure Interstellar, in a supporting role.

In October 2013, Grace joined HBO comedy pilot People in New Jersey with Sarah Silverman, but in January 2014, the pilot was passed on.

Grace co-starred in the comedy film American Ultra (2015), alongside Jesse Eisenberg and Kristen Stewart, playing a CIA agent. That same year, he co-starred in Truth, with Robert Redford and Cate Blanchett, and based on the story of CBS's 60 Minutes report that George W. Bush had received preferential treatment to keep him out of the Vietnam War. Grace played Mike Smith, a researcher on the story.

In January 2018, Grace joined the supernatural-thriller Delirium, which centers on a man recently released from a mental institute who inherits a mansion after his parents die. After a series of disturbing events, he comes to believe it is haunted. In August 2018, Grace portrayed David Duke in the biographical crime film BlacKkKlansman, directed by Spike Lee, alongside John David Washington and Adam Driver. In 2019, he played Billy Bauer in the 2nd episode of Black Mirror’s 5th season, titled "Smithereens". 
In 2020, Grace was cast in ABC's Home Economics pilot. On April 30, 2022, it was announced that Grace would have a guest appearance in the follow-up sitcom, That '90s Show.

Editing and "Lou's Cafe" 
Grace has long held an interest in making his own edits of popular films, particularly those involving Star Wars. He has stated that this has become a source of relaxation for him. His edits were shared on his now-defunct pop-culture website Cereal Prize.

In 2012, he edited the Star Wars prequel trilogy into one 85-minute film, titled Star Wars: Episode III.5: The Editor Strikes Back and showed it to select audiences. The edit utilized original footage, music from the Clone Wars series, and a portion from Anthony Daniels' audiobook recordings.

In 2014, he created a cut of Boogie Nights that served as a reconstruction of the character Brock Landers' fake movie "Angels Live in My Town".

In 2018, he created his own edit of The Hobbit, stating that "I think that maybe The Hobbit should've been one movie, and many people would agree. Money drives a lot of those franchises. It's better when the art leads." He specifically edited this as a way to relax while portraying David Duke in Spike Lee's BlacKkKlansman.

In 2019, Grace and editor Jeff Yorkes started a Twitter account for "Lou's Cafe", the pseudonym by which the two credit their work. The name comes from the diner featured in the film Back to the Future. Later that year, he and Yorkes were commissioned by Pixar to edit a retrospective for Toy Story 4, which was titled "Toy Story 4 Ever" and released on Pixar's YouTube account.

Personal life
Grace started dating actress Ashley Hinshaw in January 2014, and the two became engaged in January 2015.  On May 29, 2016, Grace and Hinshaw married near Santa Barbara, California.  On August 1, 2017, Hinshaw confirmed that she and Grace were expecting their first child.  Their daughter was born on November 1, 2017. On January 5, 2020, Hinshaw confirmed that she and Grace were expecting their second child together; their child was born in 2020. On September 30, 2022, Grace announced the news on The Kelly Clarkson Show that he and Hinshaw were expecting their third child together.    

Grace is a supporter of FINCA International, a microfinance organization.

Filmography

Films

Television

Music videos

Theatre

Video games

Awards and nominations

Film

Television

References

External links

 
 
 IGN Films interview (December 22, 2004)
 About.com interview (January 2004)

1978 births
Living people
20th-century American male actors
21st-century American male actors
American male film actors
American male television actors
American male voice actors
American people of German-Jewish descent
American people of Irish descent
Daytime Emmy Award winners
Jewish American male actors
Male actors from Connecticut
Outstanding Performance by a Cast in a Motion Picture Screen Actors Guild Award winners
People from Darien, Connecticut
Darien High School alumni
21st-century American Jews